Patrick Bourke (26 March 1883 – 26 February 1930) was an Australian rules footballer who played with Richmond in the Victorian Football League (VFL).

Notes

External links 

1883 births
1930 deaths
Australian rules footballers from Victoria (Australia)
Richmond Football Club players